James Calvin Summers (14 February 1838 – 9 May 1927) was a private in the United States Army who was awarded the Presidential Medal of Honor for gallantry during the American Civil War. Summers was awarded the medal on 25 February 1895 for actions performed at the Siege of Vicksburg in Mississippi on 22 May 1863.

Personal life 
Summers was born on the Elk River approximately 6 miles upriver from Charleston, West Virginia. He married Laverna C. Stump and fathered 5 children. After the war, he worked as a farmer and a wagon driver. He died on 9 May 1927 in Elkview, West Virginia and was buried in Summers Cemetery in Elkview. He was reinterred in the Donel C. Kinnard Memorial State Veterans Cemetery in Dunbar, West Virginia on 31 October 2019.

Military service 
Summers enlisted in the Army on 18 August 1861 at Point Pleasant, West Virginia. He was assigned to Company H of the 4th West Virginia Infantry. On 22 May 1863, at the Siege of Vicksburg, he volunteered to join a storming party of 150 men whose mission it was to build a temporary bridge over a Confederate moat east of Vicksburg, Mississippi in anticipation of a Union offensive later that day. Approximately 85 percent of the men were killed or wounded during the charge.

Summers' Medal of Honor citation reads:

Summers was mustered out of the Army on 26 August 1864.

References 

1838 births
1927 deaths
American Civil War recipients of the Medal of Honor
Military personnel from Charleston, West Virginia
Union Army soldiers